In molecular biology the PLAT domain is a protein domain that is found in a variety of membrane or lipid associated proteins.  It is called the PLAT (Polycystin-1, Lipoxygenase, Alpha-Toxin) domain<ref
name="PUB00018111"></ref> or LH2 (Lipoxygenase homology) domain.  The known structure
of pancreatic lipase shows this domain binds to procolipase , which mediates membrane association.

This domain forms a beta-sandwich composed of two β-sheets of four β-strands each.

Human proteins containing this domain 
ALOX12;    ALOX12B;   ALOX12P2; ALOX15;    ALOX15B;   ALOX5;     ALOXE3;    LIPC;
LIPG;      LOXHD1;    LPL;       PKD1;      PKD1L1;    PKD1L2;    PKD1L3;    PKDREJ;
PNLIP;     PNLIPRP1; PNLIPRP2; PNLIPRP3; RAB6IP1;

References

Protein domains
Peripheral membrane proteins